Scalidomia fetialis is a moth in the family Tineidae. It is found in West- and Central-Africa and on the Comoros.

This species has a wingspan of 14–16 mm. Its head is pale ochreous mixed with fuscous, the forewings are pale ochreous strigulated with fuscous and a basal patch and an oblique fasciae before the middle.

References

Tineidae
Moths described in 1917